K. Amarnath (1 Dec 1914 – 14 May 1983) was one of the earliest film makers of Indian Cinema. His career as a movie producer and director spanned over four decades in the film industry.

Early life
Amarnath Gelaram Khetarpal was born in Mianwali, Punjab, British India. He spent his childhood in Mianwali and college years in Lahore. Inspired by Hollywood and British movies, Amarnath left home at a young age of 17 to join the film industry to become an actor.

Career
Initially, K.Amarnath struggled for 4 years, first in Calcutta and then in Bombay acting in minor roles only. 
While working as a junior artiste, he realized that the director played a very important role in the making of a movie. 
So, his interest in acting in movies transferred to directing movies.

After assisting various directors such as B.R.Patel and Dhirubhai Desai, he finally got his first break as a director in 1936 by Mr. Lakhia of Metro Movietone for the film titled "Matwali Jogan" aka "A Girl from Lahore". He was only 21 years old when he directed his first movie.

However, his major break came in 1937 when Ramaniklal & Mohanlal Shah, founders of Mohan Studios, Mumbai, offered him the opportunity to direct "Danger Signal" in Tamil.

At first, he directed 5 Tamil movies for Mohan Studios; two of them, "Minnalkodi" and "Veer Ramani" - both released in 1937 and both starring K.T.Rukmini and B.Srinivas Rao became super hits.

From 1937 to 1951, he directed 14 movies for Mohan Studios and its sister concern, Ramnik Productions.

Excepting for "Village Girl", mostly all of them were action movies.
 
During the same time span, being an independent director, he also directed 6 movies for different production houses.

In 1952, K.Amarnath created his own production company, "K.Amarnath Productions" and in 1953 released "Alif-Laila" - the first movie under his banner,
followed by 11 more movies made under his production company.
 
From 1936 to 1971, K.Amarnath produced/directed 35 movies.

His office was located at Ranjit Studios, Dadar, Mumbai.

K.Amarnath was a very versatile man. He not only produced and directed movies but also wrote the story & screenplay for many of his movies. Over the course of his career, the genres of the movies he directed ranged from action/suspense thrillers to family/social drama, legendary romantic tragedies, semi-musicals, costume drama to magical/fantasy movies. (See Filmography below).

Many well-known actors and music directors, worked in his movies. Some of them were - Ajit, Jayant (father of Amjad Khan), Murad, Pran (actor), Yakub, Gope, Mukri, Sajjan, Kishore Kumar, Shammi Kapoor, Joy Mukherjee, Sanjay Khan, Bharat Bhushan, Salim Khan, Mehmood, Madhubala, Geeta Bali, Meena Kumari, Vyjayantimala, Nutan, Nimmi, Nalini Jaywant, Nanda, Nigar Sultana, Noor Jehan, Kum Kum, Kamini Kaushal, Shakila, Shashikala,   Helen, Cuckoo, Indurani and also K.T.Rukmini & B.Shrinavasa Rao in the Tamil movies directed by him. Some of the music directors who gave their most memorable music in his movies were Nashad, Chitragupta (composer), O.P.Nayyar, Shyam Sundar, Kalyanji-Anandji, Laxmikant-Pyarelal, Ghulam Mohammed, Sardar Malik, and the brothers, Pt.Amarnath, Husnlal & Bhagatram.

Ajit (Ajit Khan) acted as a hero in 7 of the movies directed by K.Amarnath – Beqasoor, Meharbani, Sarkaar, Bara-Dari, Bada Bhai, Baraat and Kabli Khan. In fact, it was K.Amarnath who had suggested that he change his long name of "Hamid Ali Khan" to a shorter name. The first movie with his name changed to "Ajit" was "Beqasoor" -1950.

Shyam Sundar composed many unforgettable melodious songs in 3 of the hit movies directed by K.Amarnath – "Gaon ki Gori"- 1945, "Bazaar" - 1949 and "Alif-Laila" 1953.

Mohammed Rafi always "considered" the song "aji dil ho kaaboo mein to dildaar ki aisi taisi" with G. M. Durrani and chorus - music by Shyam Sundar from "Gaon ki Gori" 1945 - to be his first Hindi Film Song.

Noor Jehan was the heroine of 2 of the movies directed by K.Amarnath – “Gaon ki Gori “– 1945 and “Mirza Sahiban” – 1947. Both of them were super hits. Mirza Sahiban was her last movie in India before she moved to Pakistan.

K.Amarnath was well known for promoting aspiring young individuals. He introduced Salim Khan to the movies. (Salim of Salim–Javed fame and father of Bollywood superstar, Salman Khan). 
The first movie Salim acted in was K.Amarnath's " Baraat" – 1960.

Sanjay Khan's first movie signed as a hero in 1965 was for "Woh Din Yaad Karo".

Helen (actress) got her first break as a main/solo dancer in K. Amarnath's "Alif-Laila" - 1953.

Also, Minoo Mumtaz, sister of the famous Bollywood comedian Mehmood, made her film debut in K.Amarnath's "Bara-Dari" - 1955.

Four of the Hindi movies directed by K.Amarnath:
Village Girl-Gaon Ki Gori -  1945
Mirza Sahibaan - 1947 - 
Beqasoor - 1950 (List of Bollywood films of 1950) and
Bara-Dari - 1955 (List of Bollywood films of 1955)
were among the top-grossing films of those years.

Family
K.Amarnath lived in Shivaji Park, Mumbai - was married to Sumitra Batra and had 4 children – 2 sons and 2 daughters - Satish, Manmohan, Manju & Madhu.

Filmography

References

External links
 .  K.Amarnath at Internet Movie DataBase
 . Bara-Dari - 1955 at Internet Movie DataBase

20th-century Indian film directors
1914 births
1983 deaths
Film directors from Mumbai
Hindi-language film directors
Hindi screenwriters
20th-century Indian dramatists and playwrights
Screenwriters from Mumbai
Film producers from Mumbai
Screenwriters from Punjab, India
People from Mianwali District
20th-century Indian screenwriters